Raymond Dutcher (February 2, 1885 – October 8, 1975) was an American fencer. He competed in the individual and team épée events at the 1920 Summer Olympics.

References

External links
 

1885 births
1975 deaths
American male épée fencers
Olympic fencers of the United States
Fencers at the 1920 Summer Olympics
Sportspeople from Elizabeth, New Jersey